Don't Ever Marry is a 1920 American comedy film directed by Marshall Neilan and Victor Heerman and written by Marion Fairfax. The film stars Matt Moore, Marjorie Daw, Thomas Jefferson, Mayme Kelso, Betty Bouton and Christine Mayo. The film was released on April 18, 1920, by First National Exhibitors' Circuit.

Cast       
Matt Moore as Joe Benson
Marjorie Daw as Dorothy Whynn
Thomas Jefferson as Mr. Dow 
Mayme Kelso as Mrs. Dow
Betty Bouton as Barbara Dow
Christine Mayo as Myra Gray
Herbert Standing as John Sitterly
David Butler as Bill Fielding
Wesley Barry as Bellhop
Tom Wilson as House Detective

References

External links
 

1920 films
1920s English-language films
Silent American comedy films
1920 comedy films
First National Pictures films
Films directed by Marshall Neilan
Films directed by Victor Heerman
American silent feature films
American black-and-white films
1920s American films